Richard Castillo may refer to:

 Richard Castillo (Star Trek), a character on Star Trek
 Richard Castillo (baseball) (born 1989), baseball pitcher
 Richard Moreta Castillo (born 1965),  architect